Braarudosphaera bigelowii is a coastal coccolithophore in the fossil record going back 100 million years. The family Braarudosphaeraceae are single-celled coastal phytoplanktonic algae with calcareous scales with five-fold symmetry, called pentaliths. With 12 sides, it has a regular dodecahedral structure, approximately 10 micrometers across.

The genus name of Braarudosphaera is in honour of Trygve Braarud (1903–1985), who was a Norwegian botanist. He specialized in marine biology, and was affiliated with the University of Oslo.

References

Haptophyte species